Charles Kimbell is an American politician who has served in the Vermont House of Representatives since 2017. He was a candidate for Lieutenant Governor of Vermont in 2022. He lost the primary to David Zuckerman in August 2022.

References

Living people
21st-century American politicians
Democratic Party members of the Vermont House of Representatives
Vermont Progressive Party politicians
University of Vermont alumni
Year of birth missing (living people)